West Green railway station was on the abandoned Palace Gates Line in North London. It was in West Green on the north side of West Green Road, west of the junction with Philip Lane, and near the Black Boy public house. The Great Eastern Railway opened it on 1 January 1878. Competition from nearby railway lines and the Underground Piccadilly line rendered the Palace Gates line unprofitable and the line and the station were closed for passenger services on 7 January 1963 and for freight on 7 December 1964 by British Rail.

Afterwards the shallow cutting that housed the station was filled in and the site is now occupied by a school and sports field. Two small buildings from the station frontage were used as shops until their demolition in August 2003.

References

External links
 
 Disused station website - West Green Station - includes a 1968 photo of the station before its demolition.

Disused railway stations in the London Borough of Haringey
Former Great Eastern Railway stations
Railway stations in Great Britain opened in 1878
Railway stations in Great Britain closed in 1963
Buildings and structures in Tottenham